Harold J. Ross (born December 6, 1956) is an American fine art photographer, best known for his fine art photography work in the light-painting method. He is acknowledged as having developed specific techniques using digital multi-capture processes to create images with incredible depth and detail.

He teaches workshops in his methods and mentors his students who seek his tutelage from around the world.

Biography
Ross was born in Fort Riley, Kansas to parents Howard Eugene Ross and Margareta Maier Ross. Howard was active in the United States Army and was trained to be a Computer Systems Analyst, while Margareta was a homemaker. Harold is the second youngest of his 3 siblings.

Between 1960 and 1962, Harold lived in Nuremberg, Germany, his mother's hometown. Due to his father's activity in the Army, Harold and his family moved multiple times during his childhood. In 1962, Harold and his family relocated to White Sands, New Mexico, where Harold attended White Sands Elementary School. Harold's family moved again in 1967 to Heidelberg, Germany, where Harold attended the American Heidelberg Middle School.

Harold's family relocated one last time to Aberdeen, Maryland, where Harold attended Aberdeen High School. In 1974, Harold attended the Maryland Institute College of Art, and graduated in 1978 with a Bachelor of Fine Arts degree.

After moving to West Chester, Pennsylvania, in 1987 Harold opened his commercial photography studio, Ross Studio. Since then, he has created images for national clients, as well as fine art images.  Recently, Harold has begun teaching workshops on the subject of light painting.

Awards
Harold won ASMP's "Best of Show" in 1996, and in March 2010 won first place in a national show at the Maryland Federation of Art in Annapolis, Maryland.

References

1956 births
Living people
American photographers
People from Fort Riley, Kansas
People from Aberdeen, Maryland
People from West Chester, Pennsylvania
Fine art photographers